The Impossible Dream may refer to:

Music 
 "The Impossible Dream (The Quest)", song from the 1965 musical Man of La Mancha 
 The Impossible Dream (The Sensational Alex Harvey Band album), 1974
 The Impossible Dream (Andy Abraham album), 2006
 The Impossible Dream (Andy Williams album), 1971
 The Impossible Dream (Johnny Mathis album), 1969
 The Impossible Dream (Richard & Adam album), 2013
 The Impossible Dream, alternative title of Scott: Scott Walker Sings Songs from his TV Series, an album by Scott Walker
 Impossible Dream, a 2004 album by Patty Griffin
 "The Impossible Dream", a song by the Cherry Poppin' Daddies from the album Rapid City Muscle Car

Other 
 The 1967 Boston Red Sox season, associated with the song from Man of La Mancha
 "The Impossible Dream," a 1959 episode of Alfred Hitchcock Presents
 "The Impossible Dream" (Frasier), an episode of the TV series
 Impossible Dream (advertisement), Honda advert featuring the song
 Impossible Dreams, a 2006 short story by Tim Pratt